Assandh Assembly constituency is one of the 68 assembly constituencies of Haryana, an Indian state. Assandh is also part of Karnal Lok Sabha constituency.

Members of the Legislative Assembly

See also
 Assandh
 Karnal district
 Karnal (Lok Sabha constituency)

References

Karnal district
Assembly constituencies of Haryana